Talal Najjar (5 February 1953 - 22 February 2022) was a Syrian weightlifter. He competed in the men's super heavyweight event at the 1980 Summer Olympics.

References

External links
 

1953 births
Syrian male weightlifters
Olympic weightlifters of Syria
Weightlifters at the 1980 Summer Olympics
Place of birth missing (living people)
Asian Games medalists in weightlifting
Weightlifters at the 1978 Asian Games
Weightlifters at the 1982 Asian Games
Asian Games gold medalists for Syria
Medalists at the 1978 Asian Games
Medalists at the 1982 Asian Games
20th-century Syrian people
21st-century Syrian people